The following is a timeline of the history of the city of Poltava, Ukraine.

Prior to 20th century

 1174 CE - Site "mentioned in the Hypatian Chronicle" as "Ltava."
 1240 - "Destroyed by the Golden Horde."
 1430 - "Tatar prince Leksada" in power.
 1569 - Poltava becomes part of the Polish–Lithuanian Commonwealth.
 1650 - Monastery built.
 1667 - Poltava becomes part of Russia.
 1709 - Russian forces defeat Swedish forces near city during the Battle of Poltava.
 1751 - Construction of  begins.
 1773 - Church of the Resurrection built.
 1802 - Poltava becomes "a provincial centre."
 1809 - Column of Victory installed in Alexandrovskaya Square.
 1818 -  founded.
 1870
 Poltava-South railway station begins operating.
 Mitnaggedim synagogue built (approximate date).
 1900 - Population: 53,060.

20th century

 1901 - Poltava Kyivska railway station begins operating.
 1902
 April: "Rioting in Poltava."
 May: "Martial law proclaimed in Poltava."
 December:  newspaper begins publication.
 1903 -  established.
 1908 - Zemstvo Building constructed.
 1913 - Population: 82,100.
 1924 - Military airfield begins operating.
 1930 - Poltava Institute of Agricultural Construction founded.
 1937 - Lokomotyv Stadium built.
 1939 - Population: 130,305.
 1941
 German forces take Russian air base.
 German occupation begins.
 Nazi prison established by the Germans.
 1942
 March: Dulag 205 transit camp for prisoners of war established by the Germans.
 May: Dulag 151 transit camp for POWs established by the Germans.
 June: Dulag 160 transit camp for POWs relocated from Khorol to Poltava.
 June: Dulag 205 camp relocated from Poltava to Krasnohrad.
 December: Stalag 357 prisoner-of-war camp established by the Germans.
 1943 - German occupation ends.
 1951 - Urozhai Stadium built.
 1955 - FC Vorskla Poltava football club formed.
 1959 - Population: 143,097.
 1962 -  begins operating.
 1968 -  established.
 1974 - New Poltava Airport terminal built.
 1975 - Population: 263,000.
 1985 - Population: 302,000.
 1992 -  (Вечірня Полтава) newspaper begins publication.
 2000 -  design adopted.

21st century
 2001 - Population: 317,998.
 2002 -  (Коло) newspaper begins publication.
 2006 -  (Матковський Андрій Всеволодович) becomes mayor.
 2007 - FC Poltava football club formed.
 2011 - SC Poltava football club formed.
 2013 - November:  protest begins.
 2018 - Population: 282,523 (estimate).

See also
 Poltava history
 History of Poltava (in Ukrainian)
 List of mayors of Poltava

References

This article incorporates information from the Russian Wikipedia and Ukrainian Wikipedia.

Bibliography

External links

Poltava
History of Poltava Oblast
Poltava
Years in Ukraine